Dynamite!! 2008 was the annual kickboxing and mixed martial arts event held by K-1 & DREAM on New Year's Eve, Wednesday, December 31, 2008, at the Saitama Super Arena in Saitama, Japan. It featured eleven DREAM mixed martial arts rules fights in a variety of weight classes, four K-1 rules fights, and the inaugural K-1 KOSHIEN Under 18 high school tournament.

Results

Canceled fights
An MMA bout between Mark Hunt and Jerome Le Banner was originally scheduled, but Le Banner had to withdraw a few days before the event. Melvin Manhoef was instead brought in to replace him. 
Joachim Hansen was scheduled to fight JZ Calvancante, but the bout was canceled the day of the event due to Hansen sustaining a head injury training and not passing pre-fight medicals.

Broadcast 
In Japan, parts of the event were shown live on TBS (Tokyo Broadcasting Station) in a four an hour timeslot and the full event on a delayed pay-per-view. Unlike the previous year's event, Dynamite!! did not have North American clearance in 2008.

Press conference 
On October 18, 2008, FEG held a press conference to promote the event. Although no matchups were announced several fighters were in attendance, and FEG stated more participants would be announced at a later date. The fighters in attendance were Joachim Hansen, Hayato Sakurai, Kazushi Sakuraba, Yuichi Nakanishi, Musashi, Shinya Aoki, Tatsuya Kawajiri, Mitsuhiro Ishida, Masakazu Imanari, Atsushi Yamamoto, Takeshi Yamazaki, Ikuhisa Minowa, Seichi Ikemoto, Kiyoshi Tamura, Yoshihiro Sato, Yasuhiro Kido, Mirko Cro Cop, and Kuniyoshi Hironaka.

See also 
 Dream (mixed martial arts)
 List of Dream champions
 2008 in DREAM

References

External links
Official fight card

Dream (mixed martial arts) events
K-1 events
2008 in Japan
2008 in kickboxing
2008 in mixed martial arts
Kickboxing in Japan
Mixed martial arts in Japan
Sport in Saitama (city)